Aethes olibra is a species of moth of the family Tortricidae. It was described by Razowski in 1994. It is endemic to Jamaica.

References

olibra
Endemic fauna of Jamaica
Moths described in 1994
Taxa named by Józef Razowski
Moths of the Caribbean